The 2021 FineMark Women's Pro Tennis Championship was a professional women's tennis tournament played on outdoor clay courts. It was the second edition of the tournament which was part of the 2021 ITF Women's World Tennis Tour. It took place in Bonita Springs, United States between 10 and 16 May 2021.

Singles main-draw entrants

Seeds

 1 Rankings are as of 26 April 2021.

Other entrants
The following players received wildcards into the singles main draw:
  Hailey Baptiste
  Ashlyn Krueger
  Robin Montgomery
  Katie Volynets

The following player received entry using a protected ranking:
  Vera Lapko

The following players received entry from the qualifying draw:
  Mirjam Björklund
  Hanna Chang
  Victoria Duval
  Irina Fetecău
  Yuriko Lily Miyazaki
  Kyōka Okamura
  Despina Papamichail
  Alycia Parks

The following player received entry as a lucky loser:
  Catherine Harrison

Champions

Singles

  Katie Volynets def.  Irina Bara, 6–7(4–7), 7–6(7–2), 6–1.

Doubles

  Erin Routliffe /  Aldila Sutjiadi def.  Eri Hozumi /  Miyu Kato, 6–3, 4–6, [10–6]

References

External links
 2021 FineMark Women's Pro Tennis Championship at ITFtennis.com
 Official website

2021 ITF Women's World Tennis Tour
2021 in American sports
May 2021 sports events in the United States